Flamingo Airport may refer to:

 Flamingo International Airport, located at Kralendijk, Bonaire, Netherlands Antilles (IATA: BON, ICAO: TNCB)
 Flamingo Airport (Costa Rica), located at Flamingo, Costa Rica (IATA: FMG, ICAO: MRFL)